Doris Günther (born 3 May 1978 in Zell am See) is a snowboarder from Austria. She competed for Austria at the 2010 Winter Olympics in parallel giant slalom, finishing ninth. Günther later captured a bronze medal at the 2011 FIS Snowboarding World Championships. She had previously won two silver medals at the 2009 FIS Snowboarding World Championships.

References

External links
 
 
 

1978 births
Living people
Austrian female snowboarders
Olympic snowboarders of Austria
Snowboarders at the 2002 Winter Olympics
Snowboarders at the 2006 Winter Olympics
Snowboarders at the 2010 Winter Olympics
Recipients of the Decoration of Honour for Services to the Republic of Austria
People from Zell am See
Sportspeople from Salzburg (state)